Alain Manoukian (born 19 February 1946) is a French fashion designer and owner of the Manoukian fashion group. Manoukian began his career in the fashion industry in 1972. Established as a franchise in 1979, the company eventually opened 450 stores throughout the world, 300 of which are in France. After the Manoukian company was sold in 2005 to BCBG, Alain Manoukian now heads the Financiere Saxe development group based in France.

Early life
Alain Manoukian was born to Armenian parents in Marseille, France, on 19 February 1946. His grandparents, along with his father, arrived in France from Aleppo, Syria in 1927. The family was originally from Kharpert and during the Armenian genocide, they were deported to Syria. During the deportations, Manoukian's father lost six siblings. The family managed to emigrate to France with the help of the Nansen Passport. When living in Marseille, Manoukian's parents were involved with shoe-making.

Career
Alain Manoukian's first store was opened in 1972 with the help of his wife Danielle Manoukian. The store mostly featured sweater designs. In 1979, the company became a franchise and in 1984, it began to expand worldwide. In 1985, the company went public and was listed on the Lyon Stock Exchange.

During the 1988 Armenian earthquake, Manoukian was one of the first to send relief supplies. The relief supplies required four airplanes to have it delivered. In honor of his father, he sponsored the construction of an Armenian church next to Lake Sevan.

By 1990, the company eventually opened four-hundred fifty stores throughout the world, three hundred of which are in France and was worth $140 million.

In 2001, Manoukian launched two websites which featured an e-commerce section that had in stock seven-hundred clothing items for sale. A year later, in 2002, the company started the Séda Manoukian brand which appeals to the youth market.

BCBG Max Azria Group, Inc. bought the company in August 2005 and introduced it to the American market.

He now heads the Financiere Saxe group based in France. The group sponsors the renovations of major cities throughout the country. The group sponsored and financed a development project in the city of Montpellier on the boulevard du Jeu-de-Paume.

His son David Manoukian is the founder, chairman, and chief executive officer of the luxury social network service The Sphere.

Distinctions
Some of Alain Manoukian's distinctions include:
National Order of Merit
Chevalier of the Legion of Honor

References

External links
Interview with Alain Manoukian on Shant TV Armenian (in Armenian)

Living people
Ethnic Armenian philanthropists
Businesspeople from Marseille
French philanthropists
French people of Armenian descent
French fashion designers
1946 births
Recipients of the Legion of Honour